Jaipur Stock Exchange (JSE) was located in Jaipur Rajasthan. JSE closed operations and was issued closure by SEBI in March 2015.

JSE was founded and recognized  in  1989. JSE was at one time third largest exchange in India in terms of membership. Dr. J N Dhankhar started as Executive Director of JSE. Within seven years of its incorporation, i.e. by January 1996, JSE managed to list 750 companies and volume of daily turnover rose to average of Rs.80 million.

JSE was one of the 15 regional Stock Exchanges which promoted Inter-connected Stock Exchange of India Ltd. by paying the Initial Capital of Rs.1 crore (Rs.5 lakhs as admission fee and Rs.95 lakhs as infrastructure fee).

See also 
 List of South Asian stock exchanges
 List of stock exchanges in the Commonwealth of Nations

References

External links
 

Economy of Jaipur
Former stock exchanges in India
1989 establishments in Rajasthan
Indian companies established in 1989
Indian companies disestablished in 2015